Lower Hergest is a hamlet in Herefordshire, England.

The local manor house, Hergest Court, is a Grade II* listed building built of a mixture of stone and timber frame with a moat. It dates back to c1430 and was built for Thomas Vaughan, son of Sir Roger Vaughan. It was the birthplace of Margaret Vaughan, wife of Sir John Hawkins.

References

Hamlets in Herefordshire